The Yesharah Society is a social organization of the Church of Jesus Christ of Latter-day Saints (LDS Church) for females who have returned from serving as church missionaries. The organization was created in December 1928 under the name "Y Missionary Women" ("Y" referring to Brigham Young University (BYU)). In 1932, the name of the society was changed to "Yesharah", a Hebrew word meaning "upright, just, good, or pleasing". The Yesharah Society reached its peak in popularity in the 1950s and 1960s, but began to decline at the end of the 20th century. Although the organization still exists today, most of the chapters are beginning to fade away.

Beginnings
Single Latter-day Saint women have been missionaries for the LDS Church since 1898, when Amanda Inez Knight Allen and Lucy Jane Brimhall Knight received their calling to serve in the British Isles. However, the number of women serving missions for the church were few until the early 1920s. In 1915, the First Presidency, consisting of Joseph F. Smith, Anthon H. Lund, and Charles W. Penrose, stated that they were "greatly in need of lady missionaries in the United States Missions". With a growing number of returning female missionaries, there became a both a need and a desire to form an organization of returned women missionaries.

The Yesharah Society did not begin as an independent group, however. From 1915 to 1929, female returned missionaries were included with male returned missionaries in the Young Doctors of Divinity Club, or Y.D.D. On November 11, 1928, the YDD was invited to reorganize as part of the Friars' Club, an all-male Christian organization. An initial vote was taken by the Y.D.D. on the issue and the motion to join the Friars' Club failed. However, several of the male members of the Y.D.D. and the University of Utah Friars' Club attempted to push ahead with the reorganization anyway. Finally, BYU President Franklin S. Harris assessed the situation and stated that the Y.D.D. would only be able to reorganize into the Friars' Club if the "lady missionaries" were reorganized into their own club as well.

The "Y" Missionary Women Constitution
After Harris's announcement, the "lady missionaries" acted on their own before the Y.D.D was dissolved. In December 1928, returned sister missionaries of the Y.D.D invited other female missionaries to meet with them at the home of Amanda Inez Knight Allen, who held the prominent position of being the first single sister missionary for the LDS Church. There, under the direction of Barbara Maughn Roskelly, this group of women formed the "Y Missionary Women" group, electing Allen as the first president. Some of the initial members of the "Y Missionary Women" included, along with Allen and Knight, Elizabeth Souter, Georgia Maesar, Anna Boss Hart, Alice Louise Reynolds, and others. In the earliest years of the group there were approximately 40 members. Out of these 40 initial members, 34 were single and only six were married. Although the "Y Missionary Women" reorganized itself before the Y.D.D. could vote to exclude them, it was not something that the Y.D.D. women originally wanted to do. Re-organization was something that they fought against, and it would remain a bitter memory for the Yesharah Society even into the late 1950s.

At its founding in December 1928, the "Y Missionary Women" took part of the Friars' Club Constitution and placed it word-for-word in their own. This statement outlined the intentions of the "Y Missionary Women" as to "keep ever paramount in the lives of its members the high and worthy ideals [of manhood] which they have promulgated while active in the missionary field" and to "promote educational, cultural, and social development in the members of the organization". To these first two purposes copied from the Friars' Club, the "Y Missionary Women" added three others: "1) To be a sister in very deed to each and every member, 4) Uphold the ideals and promote the interests of the educational institutions with which this organization shall be affiliated, and 3) Give special encouragement to our sisters laboring in the mission field." The qualifications to be a member of the organization were threefold: to have been "regularly called to and honorably released" from an LDS Mission, Be in good standing with the church, and be affiliated with BYU. From the beginning, the emphasis of the organization was placed on missionary work. The "Y Missionary Women" rejected the word "club" so that it would be clear that the women were to be a missionary organization with local chapters.

Organization of the Yesharah Society
In 1932, at the suggestion of BYU professor Sidney Sperry, the "Y Missionary Women" changed its name to "Yesharah". "Yesharah" is a Hebrew adjective meaning "straight, upright, just, righteous, good, and pleasing". At this time, the new society further organized itself. The Yesharah Society's revised 1932 Constitution stated that the organization's executive officers would consist of a President, First and Second Vice Presidents, Recording Secretary-Treasurer, and a Corresponding Secretary. In addition there were to be three committees within the society: The membership committee, program committee, and project committee.  The annual dues at the time were $2.00 per member, and members were to be organized in to more local chapters, the first of which was the Provo Chapter. 
The emphasis within the newly named society continued to be missionary work. The Yesharah Society maintained a standard of high ideals, as characterized by a 1932 Yesharah Poem:

Should mission memories be forgot and never brought to mind?
Should we forget the days we spent in service to mankind?
Oh know we'll strive our very best to ever keep in mind.
The lessons we to others taught, the way of life to find.
And here's a vow, my sisters true we'll make anew this day
That we shall teach in faith and love the truths that point the way.

The Yesharah Society's Constitution ensured that the organization would remain professional and purpose-centered, specifying that the Constitution and by-laws were to be read biannually, and that all meetings would be conducted according to Roberts Rules of Order. As the Yesharah Society evolved and its purposes changed in the following years, its Constitution reflected those changes.

References

Women's clubs in the United States
Women's organizations based in the United States
Mormonism and women
1928 establishments in Utah
Christian organizations established in 1928
Yesharah
Latter Day Saint fraternities and sororities in the United States
Harold B. Lee Library-related 20th century articles